The 1937 All-Ireland Senior Football Championship was the 51st staging of Ireland's premier Gaelic football knock-out competition. In the All Ireland semifinal Cavan ended Mayo's day as All Ireland Champions. Kerry won the title.

Results

Connacht Senior Football Championship

Leinster Senior Football Championship

Munster Senior Football Championship

Ulster Senior Football Championship

All-Ireland Senior Football Championship

Championship statistics

Miscellaneous

 Lettekenny's pitch is named O'Donnell Park after Hugh O'Donnell.
 There was 3 replays in the Leinster Football championship 1 in the preliminary round game between Wexford vs Louth and 2 Quarterfinals between Offaly vs Laois and Dublin vs Louth.
 The last year that All Ireland Semifinals were no longer outside Rotation cycle.

References

All-Ireland Senior Football Championship